Nikal-mati (14th century BC) was a queen of the Hittite empire, the wife of king Tudhaliya I. She was a mother of queen Ašmu-nikal and grandmother of King Tudhaliya II.

Sources 

Hittite queens
14th-century BC women